Thresholds is a 501(c)3  nonprofit organization founded in 1959 serving  persons with mental illnesses and substance abuse problems in Illinois. Thresholds has over 1,000 employees offering support programs in Chicago, its suburbs, and nine surrounding counties. 
Thresholds is the largest community-based mental healthcare provider in Illinois.
Its main office is in Ravenswood, Chicago.

References

External links

1959 establishments in Illinois
Mental health organizations in Illinois
Non-profit organizations based in Chicago